Ala Abdessaheb al-Alwan (born 1949) was Minister of Education in the cabinet appointed by the Interim Iraq Governing Council in September 2003, and Minister of Health in the Iraqi Interim Government.

In September 2019, Alwan officially resigned as the Health Minister of Iraq, following alleged political pressure and defamatory attempts against him. It was the second resignation that Prime Minister Adil Abdul-Mahdi received from him after March.

Education and career
Alwan graduated in Medicine from the University of Alexandria. He practiced medicine in Scotland and obtained his postgraduate training and qualifications in the United Kingdom. Following his return to Iraq, he held several positions in clinical and academic medicine and public health. He was Professor and Dean of the Faculty of Medicine, Al-Mustansiriya University, Baghdad.

Alwan left Iraq in 2005 back to the World Health Organization, where he held several leading positions at the World Health Organization based in Geneva, Switzerland including Assistant Director General for noncommunicable diseases and mental health, and Representative of the Director General  for emergencies and health action in crises. 

In October 2011, he was elected by Member States for the position of Regional Director of the World Health Organization Region of the Eastern Mediterranean (covering Arab countries, Afghanistan, Iran and Pakistan). His appointment was confirmed by the WHO Executive Board in January 2012. 

After his retirement, Alwan served on the selection committee that chose Peter Sands to succeed Mark Dybul as executive director of the Global Fund to Fight AIDS, Tuberculosis and Malaria (GFATM) in 2017. He was subsequently appointed by WHO Director-General Tedros Adhanom Ghebreyesus to serve on the Independent High-level Commission on Non-Communicable Diseases from 2018 until 2019.

Other activities
 World Health Summit (WHS), Member of the Council
 DCP3, Member of the Advisory Committee to the Editors
 Lancet-O'Neill Institute Georgetown University Commission on Global Health and Law, Member

References

Further reading

1949 births
Living people
Iraqi public health doctors
Health ministers of Iraq
People from Baghdad
Iraqi Shia Muslims
Academic staff of Al-Mustansiriya University
World Health Organization officials
Iraqi officials of the United Nations
Education ministers of Iraq